Kim Amb (born 31 July 1990) is a Swedish track and field athlete who competes in the javelin throw. His personal best is 86.49 m, set in 2020. He finished in seventh place at the 2012 European Championships and 18th in the 2012 Summer Olympics.  In 2016, he finished in 17th at the Olympic Games, and in 7th at the European Championships. In 2019, he finished in 8th at the World Championships.

Competition record

Seasonal bests by year
2008 - 67.59
2010 - 77.81
2011 - 80.09
2012 - 81.84
2013 - 84.61
2014 - 84.14
2015 - 82.40
2016 - 84.50
2019 - 86.03
2020 - 86.49
2021 - 82.40

References

 IAAF profile for Kim Amb

Swedish male javelin throwers
1990 births
Living people
Athletes (track and field) at the 2012 Summer Olympics
Athletes (track and field) at the 2016 Summer Olympics
Olympic athletes of Sweden
World Athletics Championships athletes for Sweden
People from Solna Municipality
Swedish Athletics Championships winners
Athletes (track and field) at the 2020 Summer Olympics
Sportspeople from Stockholm County